Dizzy Season is the second studio album by Japanese pop band The Tambourines. It was released on April 23, 2003, through Giza Studio.

Background
The album consists of three previous released singles, such as "Wonder boy",  and "Afresh wish".

Atsui Namida received special mix under title album version. This time five songs out of ten were composed by band themselves.

A singles Wonder Boy was released in the Giza Studio's compilation album Giza Studio Masterpiece Blend 2002 and  Afresh wish in the compilation album Giza Studio Masterpiece Blend 2003.

Charting performance
The album charted at #115 on the Oricon charts in its first week. It charted for 2 week and sold more than 3,000 copies.

Track listing

In media
Wonder boy - ending theme for Yomiuri TV program Ban!Boo!Pain!!
Afresh wish - ending theme for Tokyo Broadcasting System Television program Sanma no Super Karakuri TV

References

2003 albums
Being Inc. albums
Japanese-language albums
Giza Studio albums